The Federal Polytechnic, Ekowe is a federal government higher education institution located in Ekowe, Bayelsa State, Nigeria. The current acting Rector is Iwekumo Wauton.

History 
The Federal Polytechnic, Ekowe was established in 2009.

Courses 
The institution offers the following courses;

 Statistics
 Computer Science
 Local Government Studies
 Accountancy
 Electrical/Electronic Engineering Technology
 Business Administration and Management
 Science Laboratory Technology
 Public Administration

References 

Federal polytechnics in Nigeria
2009 establishments in Nigeria
Organizations based in Bayelsa State